= Didymocheliidae =

Scientific classification
- Kingdom: Animalia
- Phylum: Arthropoda
- Class: Malacostraca
- Order: Amphipoda
- Superfamily: Amphilochoidea
- Family: Didymocheliidae

Family of crustaceans

Didymocheliidae is a family of crustaceans belonging to the order Amphipoda.

Genera:

- Aidamochelia Thomas & Watling, 2012
- Apodidymochelia Thurston, 1997
- Didymochelia Barnard, 1931
